Pinus amamiana (Amami pine, Yakushima white pine) is a species of pine. It is a native of southern Japan, on the islands of Yakushima and Tanegashima south of Kyūshū. It has also been grown horticulturally in Japanese parks. This pine can grow to a height of 25 m with a trunk diameter of up to 1 m.

The needles grow in bundles of five and the cones are 5–8 cm in length.

This tree is known in Japanese as amami-goyōmatsu, amami-goyō, and yakutane-goyō.

References

amamiana
Endemic flora of Japan
Trees of Japan
Endangered flora of Asia